Pawleena is a locality and small rural community in the local government area of Sorell, in the Sorell and surrounds region of Tasmania. The 2016 census determined a population of 102 for the state suburb of Pawleena.

History
The original name of the locality was “Cherry Tree Opening”. The current name dates from about 1923. It is an Aboriginal word for “gun”.

Road infrastructure
The C332 route (Pawleena Road) runs north from the Arthur Highway into the locality.

References

East Coast Tasmania
Towns in Tasmania
Localities of Sorell Council